Shams al-Din Abu al-Muzaffar Yusuf ibn Kizoghlu (c. 581AH/1185–654AH/1256), famously known as Sibṭ ibn al-Jawzī was a notable preacher and historian.

Title
He is the grandson of the great Hanbali scholar Abul-Faraj Ibn Al-Jawzi.

His title "Sibt ibn al-Jawzi" denotes that he is the sibṭ (grandson) of Ibn al-Jawzi from his daughter's side.

Biography

Born in Baghdad, the son of a Turkish freedman and Ibn al-Jawzi's daughter, he was raised by his famous grandfather.  After his grandfather's death he moved to Damascus, where he worked under the Ayyubids Sultans al-Mu'azzam, an-Nasir Dawud, and al-Ashraf. In 1229, on an-Nasir's command, he gave a fiery sermon in the Umayyad Mosque denouncing the treaty of Jaffa with the Crusaders as Damascus prepared for the coming siege at the hands of al-Ashraf.

Unlike his Hanbali grandfather, he was of the Hanafi madhhab, which was the judicial school common to those of Turkish descent and preferred by the Ayyubid Sultans. He has also been described as having Shia tendencies, most notably by al-Dhahabi. His historical writings, which include more critical accounts of Uthman compared to other sources, and Ibn Kathir's obituary of him have been given as evidence supporting this.

Works

Mir’at al-Zamān fī Tawarīkh al-'Ayān  'Mirror of time in histories of the notables'; 23-volume encyclopedic biographical History. www.archive.org (Beirut, 2013, in Arabic.)
The Defense and Advocacy of the True School of Law (Arabic: al-Intisar wa al-Tarjih li al-Madhhab al-Sahih) - in praise of Abu Hanifa and his school.
 Tazkirat ul-Khawasتذکرۃ الخواص-Introduced eminence of the heirs of Muhammad The Prophet of Islam

For more information on him and his works see:
 Abjad Al-Ulum - Siddiq Hasan Al Qunuji
 Kashf al-Zunun
 Mu'jam al-matbu'at

Notes

1180s births
1256 deaths
Historians from the Ayyubid Sultanate
People from Baghdad
Year of birth unknown
Hanafis
Maturidis
13th-century Syrian historians